Several battles have been fought in and around Niš, thus Battle of Niš may refer to:

Battle of Naissus (268 or 269), fought between the Roman Empire and the Goths 
Battle of Niš (1443), fought between a Christian alliance (Hungary, Poland and Serbia) against the Ottoman Empire
Battle of Niš (1689), fought between Austria and the Ottoman Empire

Battle of Niš (1878), fought between Serbia and the Ottoman Empire
Air battle over Niš, a confrontation between air forces of the Soviet Union and the United States in 1944

History of Niš